Ralph Fielding "Hutch" Hutchinson (February 19, 1878 – March 30, 1935) was an American football, basketball, and baseball player. He served as the head football coach at Dickinson College (1901), the University of Texas at Austin (1903–1905), the University of New Mexico (1911–1916), Washington & Jefferson College (1918), the University of Idaho (1919), and the Idaho Technical Institute (now Idaho State University) (1920–1927), compiling a career college football record of 62–55–6. Hutchinson was also the head basketball coach at New Mexico (1910–1917), Idaho (1919–1920), and Idaho Technical (1926–1927), amassing a career college basketball record of 56–18, and the head baseball coach at Texas from 1904 to 1906 and at New Mexico from 1910 to 1917, tallying a career college baseball mark of 69–44–2.

Playing career
Born in Elmira, New York, Hutchinson played varsity football and baseball and ran track at Princeton University. In football, he was a quarterback and later played the position as a player-coach for the Greensburg Athletic Association, an early professional football team out of Greensburg, Pennsylvania, in 1900.

Hutchinson also played minor league baseball. He played for the 1902 Flandreau Indians of the Iowa-South Dakota League. There, his manager was Art Hillebrand, who played college football with Hutchinson at Princeton and was later inducted into the College Football Hall of Fame.

Coaching career

Dickinson
Hutchison was the third head football coach at Dickinson College in Carlisle, Pennsylvania, serving for one season, in the 1901.

Texas
From 1903 to 1905, Hutchinson coached at Texas, where he compiled a 16–7–2 record.

New Mexico
Hutchinson was the first basketball coach at the University of New Mexico, compiling a 32–8 record from 1910 to 1917. New Mexico played games only sporadically before the 1920s, with no regular schedule.

Washington & Jefferson
Hutchinson was hired in August 1918 as head coach at Washington & Jefferson, south of Pittsburgh.

Idaho
Hutchinson was the head football coach at the University of Idaho for the 1919 season. A "shorter than normal" season, his team posted a  record. He also coached the basketball team for the 1919–20 season.

Idaho Technical Institute
In 1920, Hutchinson moved south to the Idaho Technical Institute in Pocatello. He coached through the 1927 season, tallying a  record at the two-year school, which was renamed the "University of Idaho–Southern Branch" in 1927. It was renamed "Idaho State College" in 1947 after gaining four-year status and became Idaho State University in 1963.

On November 4, 1922, the Idaho Tech football team played its first game on Hutchinson Field, named in his honor. The field was used until partway through the 1936 season, when football games moved to the "Spud Bowl". The former Hutchinson Field area continues to be known as the Hutchinson Memorial Quadrangle.

After coaching
After eight years in Pocatello, Hutchinson returned to the University of Idaho in Moscow in 1928, where he was the athletic director for a year, as well as the head track coach and an assistant football coach. After the hiring of Leo Calland in 1929, Hutchinson was the athletic trainer and a professor of physical education, and the head coach of minor sports. Following a brief illness, he died at the age of 57 on March 30, 1935, of a heart attack at his Moscow home. In 1980, Hutchinson was inducted to Idaho State's athletic hall of fame.

Head coaching record

College football

References

1878 births
1935 deaths
19th-century players of American football
American football quarterbacks
Basketball coaches from New York (state)
Greensburg Athletic Association coaches
Greensburg Athletic Association players
Idaho Vandals athletic directors
Idaho Vandals men's basketball coaches
Idaho Vandals football coaches
Idaho State Bengals football coaches
Idaho State Bengals men's basketball coaches
New Mexico Lobos athletic directors
New Mexico Lobos baseball coaches
New Mexico Lobos football coaches
New Mexico Lobos men's basketball coaches
Princeton Tigers baseball players
Princeton Tigers football coaches
Princeton Tigers football players
Texas Longhorns baseball coaches
Texas Longhorns football coaches
Washington & Jefferson Presidents football coaches
College men's track and field athletes in the United States
Minor league baseball players
Sportspeople from Elmira, New York
People from Moscow, Idaho
Players of American football from New York (state)
Flandreau Indians players